A wave is a disturbance that transfers energy through matter or space.

Wave or waves may also refer to:

Arts, entertainment and media

Fictional characters
 Wave (Marvel Comics), a character in the Marvel Universe
 Wave the Swallow, a character in the Sonic the Hedgehog franchise
 Wave, a character in Agame ga Kill!

Literature and writing
 Wave (magazine), an English-language, monthly magazine in Nepal
 Wave (Deraniyagala book), a 2013 memoir by Sonali Deraniyagala
 Wave Books, an American publisher

Music
 Wave music, an electronic bass music genre

Bands
 Wave (band), a Canadian pop band
 Waves (band), a New Zealand folk rock band
 Wavves, an American rock band

Albums

 Wave (Antonio Carlos Jobim album), 1967
 Wave (Patti Smith Group album), 1979
 Wave (T-Square album), 1989
 Wave (Murray Head album), 1992
 Wave (CNBLUE album), 2014
 Wave (Patrick Watson album), 2019

Songs

 "Wave" (Antonio Carlos Jobim song), 1967
 "Wave" (Beck song), 2014
 "Wave" (Meghan Trainor song), 2019
 "Wave", a 2018 song by Justin Timberlake from Man of the Woods
 "Wave", a song by Ateez from the album Treasure EP.3: One to All

Radio and television stations

 WAVE (TV), an American television station
 WAVE Radio, a radio station in Belize City 
 CHKX-FM, Canadian radio station known as Wave 947
 Wave, a pair of television idents for BBC Two; see BBC Two '1991–2001' idents

Businesses and organizations

 Wave (financial services and software), a Canadian company
 Wave Broadband, an American service provider 
 WAVE Trust, Worldwide Alternatives to Violence, a charity
 WAVES, Women Accepted for Volunteer Emergency Service, a former branch of the U.S. Navy
 Waves Audio, an Israeli company
Women Against Violence Europe

Sport
 Milwaukee Wave, an American soccer team
 Pepperdine Waves, the athletic program of Pepperdine University, U.S.
 Wilmington Waves, an American baseball team

Technology

 WAV, Waveform Audio File Format, also known as WAVE
 Wave (smart speaker), by Naver Corporation and Line Corporation
 Apache Wave, formerly Google Wave, a software framework 
 Wave, a 2014 iOS 8 hoax feature
 PV-Wave, a programming language
 WebAIM WAVE, an accessibility evaluation tool

Vehicles
 , a sailing vessel wrecked in 1848
 , operated by the Hudson's Bay Company from 1840–1841; see Hudson's Bay Company vessels
 , the name of several United States Navy ships
 Airwave Wave, an Austrian paraglider design
 Bajaj Wave, a motor scooter
 Honda Wave series, motorcycles
 Pontiac Wave, a car

Other uses
 Wave (audience), or Mexican wave, when successive spectators raise their arms
 Wave (gesture), involving moving one's hand
 Wave (typeface)
 Waves (hairstyle), a hairstyle for curly hair

See also

 
 
 Wav (disambiguation)
 Waves (disambiguation)
 The Wave (disambiguation)
 Blue Wave (disambiguation)
 Great Wave (disambiguation)
 Wave model (disambiguation)
Wave, Wave, a South Korean soap opera